Johnny Marines is an American music executive from New York City.

Biography 
Marines is of Dominican descent, and grew up in the Lower East Side of New York City. He attended Seward Park Campus and John Jay College School of Criminal Justice. He was a hard-working student and come up with best grades.. He worked as a police officer in the New York City Police Department from 1993 to 2009, and retired at the rank of sergeant.

Music career 
Marines first met Romeo Santos, lead singer/songwriter and co-producer of Aventura, in 2002 and initially performed security functions for the group. In 2003 Johnny became the group's manager. Under Marines' management, Aventura earned a Latin Grammy Award (2007), several Premio Lo Nuestro awards, Latin Billboard Music Awards, Premio Juventud awards, and an MTV Video Music Award for Latin Artist of the Year.

Romeo Santos began his solo career in 2011 with Marines as manager. Santos released the album Formula, Vol. 1 that year. The album went multi-platinum, had five hit singles, and won several awards.  Santos released his second album, Formula, Vol. 2 in 2014, which was similarly acclaimed. Santos conducted multiple tours throughout this period, and played venues including Madison Square Garden and Yankee Stadium. In 2017, Santos' third solo album, Golden was released.

From June 2016 until July 2017, Johnny was the President of Roc Nation Latin, a newly formed division within the company. In this capacity, he managed the day-to-day operations of the division and was tasked with scouting and retaining artists.

Entrepreneurship 
Marines owns several organic delis that service the people of the Lower East Side of Manhattan and is a principal business partner with key investments in several restaurants and nightlife establishments in New Jersey.

Philanthropy 
In conjunction with Aventura and Romeo Santos, Marines co-funded toy drives in New York and the Dominican Republic and donated hundreds of turkeys to low-income families during the holidays. He and his mother arrange for barrels of food and school supplies to be shipped to the Dominican Republic multiple times per year, he coordinates Santos' hospital visits to sick children in New York.

Awards and recognition
Marines was invited to be guest speaker at Harvard's youth event the Latino Leadership Initiative, in 2011, 2012, and 2013. He has also spoken at Columbia University, Lehman College, and Syracuse University in similar capacities. In 2012, Marines was interviewed to be a part of the "Famosos" section of About.com's celebrity section.

In August 2015, he was named a "Top Latin Player" by Billboard in August 2015 for his continued success in managing Romeo Santos

Achievement Awards

On May 2, 2013, Johnny received the First Annual "Outstanding Leadership Award" by Harvard University's Dominican Students Association 
On May 5, 2014, Johnny was awarded the Proclamation "A day in honor of Johnny Marines", by US Congressman, Charles B. Rangel
On December 6, 2014, Johnny was the recipient of the "Pino Serrano foundation Internacional Award 2014" 
On July 27, 2017, Johnny received remarks in the Congressional Record by Representative Tony Cardenas of California

References

Further reading 

Mejias-Rentas, Antonio. "". "Romeo Santos' Secret 'Formula': New Hits and A Tour". "Billboard.com". May 11, 2012.
Cobo, Leila. " ". "Romeo Santos Finds His Own Formula After Aventura Success". "Billboard.com". October 21, 2011.
Cobo, Leila. "Aventura's Adventure: A Hit in Europe, New York Quartet Seeks U.S. Breakthrough" Billboard. Issue number 38. April 30, 2005: 40.
Gonzalez, Carolina. "". Romeo Santos & Fans: A Love Story. NY Daily News.com. November 16, 2011.
Symkus, Ed. "Listen to the Tale of Aventura". The Edge. The Boston Herald. December 1, 2009.
Figueroa, Raymundo Monell. "Aventura Live at Madison Square Garden." DTM Magazine. Issue number 65. January 2010.

External links 
 www.johnnymarines.com
 www.romeosantosonline.com

Living people
American people of Dominican Republic descent
American bachata musicians
American male musicians
Seward Park High School alumni
People from the Lower East Side
1970 births